The Mt. SAC Relays are an annual track and field festival held primarily at Hilmer Lodge Stadium on the Mt. San Antonio College campus in Walnut, California. The Relays are held in mid-April each year  since the first edition held on April 24-25, 1959.  The meet was started by Mt. San Antonio College track coach Hilmer Lodge, and flourished under his direction until his retirement in 1963.  The meet attracts all levels and disciplines of the sport of Track and Field.  They claim to have had as many as 9,000 competitors participate in a single year.  Because of the stature of the meet, the stadium and most meet literature contains the phrase "Where the world's best athletes compete".

Divisions
While the relays are most famous for the elite division, where many notable athletes have used this event as an early season test of their fitness (before the championships that start in late May and June), there are races for small children from the community, Youth teams, and Masters athletes.  A full day is largely devoted to High School events, attracting the top Southern California talent as well as others from out of town.  International High School athletes from as far away as Australia and New Zealand have competed here, Mexico is represented regularly.  There is a "Distance Carnival" which provides a rare (American) opportunity to run in a highly competitive track 10,000 metres race.  The meet is a popular gathering for many elite throwers.  Seven world records in throwing events alone, including four in the Discus have been set at the Mt. SAC Relays.  A full multiple event competition associated with the meet (Decathlon for men and now Heptathlon for women) is held at Azusa Pacific University.  Racewalking events are held earlier in the month, with occasional elite races held on the day of the elite competition.  And with this meet being held at a Community College, there is a full competition for that level. While the relays started in 1959, the first women weren't allowed to participate until 1961, with one race, a 440-yard dash, out of a 113 event schedule. 

Past Directors of the Mt. Sac Relays include Hilmer Lodge, Don Ruh, John Norton, Scott Davis and current director, Doug Todd.

Due to construction of a new Hilmer Lodge Stadium at Mt. San Antonio College, the 2016 edition was held at Cerritos College in Norwalk and the 2017 and 2018 editions were held at El Camino College in Torrance.

Records
Over the course of its history, numerous national records in athletics and world records have been set at the Mt. SAC Relays including the world record in the 4×200m relay that lasted over 20 years (1994-2015).

World records

Meet Records

Men

Women

High School Meet Records

Boys

Girls

References

External links
Mt. SAC Relays official site
Mt. SAC Relays Records

Track and field competitions in the United States
Recurring sporting events established in 1959
Sports competitions in Los Angeles
Annual track and field meetings
High school track and field competitions in the United States
High school sports in California
Track and field in California
1959 establishments in California